This is a list of the municipalities in the state of Sergipe (SE), located in the Northeast Region of Brazil. Sergipe is divided into 75 municipalities, which are grouped into 13 microregions, which are grouped into 3 mesoregions.

See also
Geography of Brazil
List of cities in Brazil

Sergipe